Ulota crispa, the crisped pincushion moss, is a species of acrocarpous moss in the genus Ulota native to eastern North America. It is generally found in tight mounds on tree bark.

References

Orthotrichales
Flora of North America